Oldřich Marek (3 April 1911–1986) was a Czechoslovak entomologist and teacher, and a member of Czechoslovak entomological society in Prague starting in 1940.

Life
Oldřich Marek was born on 3 April 1911 in Ústí nad Orlicí. He attended Primary school in Dolní Čermná and secondary school in Česká Třebová. After completing secondary school he left for Slovakia to become a primary school teacher in Smolník, Stakčín and Trnava.

During World War II (1938–1945) he was employed as a teacher in Slatina u Moravské Třebové, Litice nad Orlicí and Dolní Čermná. In 1941 he began teaching mathematics, physics, chemistry and natural science at secondary school. After military duties in 1945 he worked as a secondary school teacher in Žamberk until his retirement in 1971.

Work
He specialised in Coleoptera especially the family Nitidulidae. In this group he studied the world fauna describing many new genera and species.

Gallery

Literature
Marek, O. & Jelínek, J. 1966. Two new Palaearctic species of the genus Meligethes Steph. (Coleoptera, Nitidulidae). Acta Entomologica Bohemoslovaca  63: 453-458.
Marek, O. 1968. Nitiduliden-Fauna (Coleoptera) aus Liberia. Natura Jutlandica 14: 153-154.
Marek, O. 1969. Die Nitiduliden Fauna von Brasilien (Coleoptera, Nitidulidae), erster Teil. Papeis Avulsos do Departamento de Zoologia Sao Paulo 22: 153-157.
Marek, O. 1982. Nitidulidae (Coleoptera) of Brazil 2. Revista Brasileira de Entomologia 26(3-4): 261-268.

References

1911 births
1986 deaths
People from Ústí nad Orlicí
Czechoslovak entomologists